HMS Flamborough Prize was a French privateer originally called Le Général Lally (General Lally). The ship was sold 15 March 1763.

Notes

References

Sloops of the Royal Navy